The 2005 FIBA U18 Women's European Championship Division B was the first edition of the Division B of the FIBA U18 Women's European Championship, the second tier of the European women's under-18 basketball championship. It was played in Bihać and Cazin, Bosnia and Herzegovina, from 5 to 14 August 2005. Belarus women's national under-18 basketball team won the tournament.

Participating teams

First round
In the first round, the teams were drawn into four groups. The first two teams from each group advance to the Quarterfinal round (Groups E and F); the other teams will play in the Classification round (Groups G and H).

Group A

Group B

Group C

Group D

Quarterfinal round
In the Quarterfinal round, the teams play in two groups of four. The first two teams from each group advance to the Semifinals; the third and fourth teams will play in the 5th–8th place playoffs.

Group E

Group F

Classification round
In the Classification round, the teams play in two groups. The first two teams from each group advance to the 9th–12th place playoffs.

Group G

Group H

13th–15th place playoffs

13th–15th place semifinal

13th place match

9th–12th place playoffs

9th–12th place semifinals

11th place match

9th place match

5th–8th place playoffs

5th–8th place semifinals

7th place match

5th place match

Championship playoffs

Semifinals

3rd place match

Final

Final standings

References

2005
2005–06 in European women's basketball
FIBA Europe
International youth basketball competitions hosted by Bosnia and Herzegovina
FIBA U18
FIBA